Les Brenets railway station is a railway station in the municipality of Le Locle, in the Swiss canton of Neuchâtel. It is the western terminus of the  Le Locle–Les Brenets line of the Transports publics Neuchâtelois.

Services 
 the following services stop at Les Brenets:

References

External links 
 
 

Railway stations in the canton of Neuchâtel
Transports publics Neuchâtelois stations